Calhoun Folk Gault (December 22, 1927 – April 19, 2019) was an American football coach and college athletics administrator. He served as the head football coach at Presbyterian College in Clinton, South Carolina from 1963 to 1984. He also served as the school's athletic director until his retirement in 1995.

Before he came to Presbyterian, he was a highly successful high school coach at North Augusta High School in North Augusta, South Carolina, winning three state championships.

Head coaching record

College

References

1927 births
2019 deaths
Presbyterian Blue Hose athletic directors
Presbyterian Blue Hose football coaches
High school football coaches in South Carolina
Presbyterian College alumni
University of South Carolina alumni
People from Bamberg, South Carolina